The Oregon Commissioner of Labor is an elected government position in the U.S. state of Oregon.  The commissioner is the chief executive of Oregon Bureau of Labor and Industries and serves a four-year term.

The commissioner is also chairperson of the State Apprenticeship and Training Council and executive secretary of the Wage and Hour Commission.  The commissioner enforces state laws related to employment, housing, and public accommodation with respect to discrimination, wages, hours of employment, working conditions, prevailing wage rates, and child labor.  The commissioner also enforces state laws prohibiting discrimination related to vocational, professional, and trade schools, and administers licensing required by many professional services.  The commissioner oversees the Wage Security Fund, a source of coverage for unpaid wages in some business closure and group health situations.

Upon inception, from 1903, the position was titled Oregon Labor Commissioner until 1918.  It was called Oregon Commissioner of the Bureau of Labor Statistics and Inspector of Factories and Workshops from 1918 until 1930.  It became Oregon Commissioner of the Bureau of Labor from 1930 to 1979 when the legislature changed it to Oregon Commissioner of Labor and Industries.

Nine individuals have served as commissioner since the office's inception.  Party affiliation is included, though the legislature made the position a nonpartisan office in 1995; the first nonpartisan election was in 1998.

References 

 
1903 establishments in Oregon